Charles Francis Adams III (August 2, 1866 – June 10, 1954) was an American lawyer and politician, who served as the 44th United States Secretary of the Navy under President Herbert Hoover from 1929 to 1933. He was skipper of the Resolute which won the 1920 America's Cup.

Adams graduated from Harvard College in 1888 and then Harvard Law School in 1892. After going from being a lawyer and then a businessman, he was elected mayor of Quincy in 1896 and unelected a year later. Adams married Frances Lovering in 1899 and they had 2 children. He proposed to the Congress in 1903 that the USS Constitution be restored. He was granted this wish in 1907 when they raised funds to make her open to the public again. Adams was an officer in 43 corporations at one point, including the Harvard Corporation. He then was appointed Secretary of the Navy in 1929. He promoted public understanding of the Navy's indispensable role in international affairs, and worked strenuously to maintain naval strength and efficiency during the Great Depression. In 1930, he successfully maintained the principle of United States' naval parity with Britain while serving at the London Naval Treaty. He retired from his position in 1933. It was noted by President Hoover he would've named Adams Secretary of State if he knew him from the start of his presidency.

Early life
Charles Francis Adams III was born on August 2, 1866, in Quincy, Massachusetts, to Frances "Fanny" Cadwalader Crowninshield and John Quincy Adams II.

Adams graduated cum laude from Harvard College in 1888, where he was a brother of the Delta Kappa Epsilon fraternity (Alpha chapter). He later graduated from Harvard Law School in 1892.

Career
After graduating from Harvard Law and being admitted to the bar in 1893, he was first a lawyer, then went into business. From 1896 to 1897, Adams served as mayor of Quincy, Massachusetts.

In 1903, while serving as president of the Massachusetts Historical Society, Adams proposed to Congress that the famed frigate USS Constitution be restored and returned to active service. This led to Congress authorizing funds for the restoration of Constitution and opening her to the public in 1907.

In 1916, the Massachusetts legislature and electorate approved a calling of a constitutional convention. Adams was elected as a delegate at large to serve as a member of the Massachusetts Constitutional Convention of 1917.

At one time, he was an officer in 43 corporations, including several banks and many of the country's largest corporations such as the New York, New Haven and Hartford Railroad, the Union Pacific Railroad, and the Harvard Corporation.

Secretary of the Navy

Adams was appointed Secretary of the Navy on March 5, 1929, by President Herbert Hoover. He vigorously promoted public understanding of the Navy's indispensable role in international affairs, and worked strenuously to maintain naval strength and efficiency during the Great Depression. He served at the London Naval Treaty in 1930 where he successfully maintained the principle of United States naval parity with Britain. In his memoirs, Hoover noted that, had he known Adams at the start of his presidency as well as he did at its end, he would have named Adams his Secretary of State. Adams retired from his position on March 4, 1933.

Adams was a supporter of limited presidential terms, well before the 22nd Amendment passed, and advocated that the Presidents should be required to renounce political parties and that after they left the presidency, should be made ex-officio members of the United States Senate.

Activities and interests
In 1920, Adams skippered the America's Cup defender Resolute and soon became known as the "Dean of American Helmsmen". He was posthumously inducted into the America's Cup Hall of Fame in 1993. In 1939, he won the King's Cup, Astor Cup, and Puritan Cup, the three most coveted domestic yachting trophies in a single season.

In 1929, he became a member of the District of Columbia Society of the Sons of the American Revolution. His national membership number was 48,952. He was also an honorary companion of the Naval Order of the United States. In 1932, he was elected a Fellow of the American Academy of Arts and Sciences.

Personal life

Family 
A scion of the Adams family that produced two presidents, Charles Francis Adams III, a son of John Quincy Adams II, the oldest son of the Charles Francis Adams Sr., was a great-grandson of the sixth U. S. President John Quincy Adams, and a great-great-grandson of the second U.S. President John Adams. His mother Fanny Crowninshield was the granddaughter of U.S. Secretary of the Navy Benjamin Williams Crowninshield. Adams was also the third cousin twice removed of Otis Norcross, the 19th Mayor of Boston. Both descending from their fourth great grandfather, Joseph Adams; Otis from his first wife Mary [Chapin], and Charles from his second wife Hannah [Bass].

Charles Francis Adams Jr. was the uncle, not the father of Charles Francis Adams III, an assumption regularly made by virtue of sequential name succession. Charles F. Adams Jr. had five children, the first three being daughters, which may explain why his brother John Q. Adams II took the prerogative to name his firstborn son after his brother. Charles, Jr.'s only sons (twins) were born in 1875.

Marriage and children 
On April 3, 1899, Adams married Frances Lovering (d. 1956), the daughter of U.S. Representative William C. Lovering (1835–1910), at St. John's Episcopal Church in Washington, D.C. Together, they had two children:

 Catherine Frances Lovering Adams in 1902, who married Henry Sturgis Morgan, son of J. P. Morgan, Jr. and one of the founders of Morgan Stanley (1935), along with Harold Stanley, on June 26, 1923. Together, they had five sons.
 Charles Francis Adams IV in 1910, who was a prominent businessman and the first president of Raytheon Company, was married firstly to Margaret [Stockton]. Their children were: Abigail Adams, Allison Adams, Charles Francis Adams V, and Timothy Adams. He married secondly, widow Mrs. Beatrice D. Penati.

Adams died on June 11, 1954, and was interred in Mount Wollaston Cemetery in Quincy, Massachusetts, on June 13, 1954. His estate, valued at $192,000 in 1954, was left to his widow.

In 1899 Adams built his family home and estate on land in Concord, MA formerly owned by his uncle, Charles Francis Adams Jr. The home, known as Mt. Vernon, stood for 120 years until it was destroyed by fire shortly after Christmas Day 2019.

Honors
The Charles Francis Adams Memorial Trophy for yacht racing was established in his memory, and the Navy destroyer USS Charles F. Adams was dedicated in his honor.

Family tree

Paternal side

Maternal side

References

External links

1866 births
1954 deaths
Adams, Charles Francis III
American male sailors (sport)
Crowninshield family
Harvard Law School alumni
Massachusetts lawyers
Mayors of Quincy, Massachusetts
United States Secretaries of the Navy
Fellows of the American Academy of Arts and Sciences
Hoover administration cabinet members
20th-century American politicians
Massachusetts Republicans
Members of the 1917 Massachusetts Constitutional Convention
Harvard College alumni
America's Cup regattas